Cerro Viejo is a corregimiento in Tolé District, Chiriquí Province, Panama. Its population as of 1990 was 2,923; its population as of 2000 was 1,709.

References

Corregimientos of Chiriquí Province